Mervyn John Byers FTCL ARCO (CHM) FRSCM (Hon) (23 March 1924 – 2 March 2011) was an Australian organist and composer.

Background

He was born on 23 March 1924 in Burwood, Sydney. After five years' war service, he won a scholarship to the Sydney Conservatorium of Music. He then completed his education at the University of London.

After he retired from Selby Abbey in 1987 he moved back to Australia.

He died on 2 March 2011 in Blackheath, NSW

Appointments

Organist at Bridlington Priory 1952 - 1957
Organist at St Andrew's Cathedral, Sydney 1957 - 1965
Organist at Selby Abbey 1966 – 1976 and  1980 - 1987

Recordings

He is well known for the recording of organ music he produced from Selby Abbey in 1969.

References

1924 births
2011 deaths
Australian classical organists
Male classical organists
Sydney Conservatorium of Music alumni
20th-century Australian musicians
20th-century Australian male musicians